The 131st Bomb Wing is a unit of the Missouri Air National Guard, stationed at Whiteman Air Force Base, Knob Noster, Missouri.  If activated to federal service, the wing is gained by the United States Air Force Global Strike Command.  It is an associate unit of the active-duty 509th Bomb Wing, which falls under the Eighth Air Force.

The 131st Bomb Wing is the only Air National Guard wing to fly the B-2 Spirit, as well as the only nuclear-capable Air National Guard bomb wing.

The 110th Bomb Squadron, which is assigned to the wing's 131st Operations Group, is a descendant organization of the World War I 110th Aero Squadron, established on 14 August 1917.  Demobilized in November 1918, it was re-established on 23 June 1923 as the 110th Observation Squadron.  The unit is one of the 29 original National Guard Observation Squadrons of the United States Army National Guard formed before World War II.  It is the oldest unit in the Missouri Air National Guard, with over 90 years of service to the state and nation.  Charles Lindbergh was a pilot of the 110th, Missouri National Guard, when he made his famous 1927 flight.

Mission
The 131st Bomb Wing's mission is to train and equip skilled and proud Airmen who provide full spectrum, expeditionary, B-2 global strike combat support capabilities to geographic commanders and the US Strategic Command combatant commander.  The wing also organizes, trains, and prepares a community-based force of ready Citizen-Airmen to defend and serve the people of Missouri.

Units
 131st Operations Group
 110th Bomb Squadron
 131st Maintenance Group
 131st Mission Support Group
 131st Medical Group

Tenant Units
 157th Air Operations Group
 239th Combat Communications Squadron
 231st Civil Engineering Flight

History

Missouri Air National Guard
The 131st Composite Wing was activated on 1 November 1950, when Continental Air Command converted its Air National Guard combat units under the Wing Base organization.  Its combat units remained under the 131st Composite Group, while former elements of the 231st Air Service Group were assigned to the wing's 131st Air Base Group and 131st Maintenance & Supply Group.

Korean War activation

On 1 March 1951 the 110th was federalized and brought to active-duty due to the Korean War.   It was initially assigned to Strategic Air Command (SAC) and transferred to Bergstrom AFB, Texas.  The 131st Fighter-Bomber Group was composed of the 110th Fighter Squadron, the 192d Fighter Squadron (Nevada ANG), the 178th Fighter Squadron (North Dakota ANG), and the 170th Fighter Squadron (Illinois ANG).   At Berstrom, its mission was a filler replacement for the 27th Fighter-Escort Group which was deployed to Japan as part of SAC's commitment to the Korean War.

The unit was at Bergstrom until November when it was transferred to Tactical Air Command (TAC) and moved to George AFB, California.  At George, the unit was scheduled to be re-equipped with F-84D Thunderjets and was programmed for deployment to Japan, however the F-84s were instead sent to France and the 131st Fighter-Bomber Wing remained in California and flew its F-51 Mustangs for the remainder of its federal service.  The 110th Fighter-Bomber Squadron was released from active duty and returned to Missouri state control on 1 December 1952.

Tactical Air Command

Returning to Lambert Field, the 131st was re-formed as a light bombardment squadron in January 1953 and came under Tactical Air Command.   It received B-26 Invaders that returned from the Korean War and trained primarily in night bombardment missions, which the aircraft specialized in while in Korea.

With the removal of the B-26 from bombing duties in 1957 as they neared the end of their service lives, the 110th entered the "Jet Age."  The 110th received its first jet aircraft in the spring of 1957 when it received some F-80 Shooting Stars, then in June 1957, it transitioned to the F-84F Thunderstreak fighter-bomber.

On 1 October 1961, as a result of the 1961 Berlin Crisis, the mobilized Missouri Air National Guard 131st Tactical Fighter Wing deployed to Toul-Rosières Air Base, France as the 7131st Tactical Fighter Wing (Provisional).  When activated as the 7131st TFW, it consisted of the 110, 169 and 170 TFS, from Lambert Field, St. Louis MO, Peoria Municipal Airport, Peoria IL, and Capitol Airport, Springfield IL, respectively.  The designation 7131st was used as the Wing, composed of three federalized ANG squadrons, only deployed the 110th Tactical Fighter Squadron to France.  The 169th and 170th TFS rotated personnel to Toul during their period of activation due to budget restraints, however only one squadron's worth of aircraft and personnel were at Toul at any one time.

While in France, guardsmen assumed regular commitments on a training basis with the U.S. 7th Army as well as maintaining a 24-hour alert status.  The 7131st exchanged both air and ground crews with the Royal Danish Air Force's 730th Tactical Fighter Squadron at Skydstrup Air Station, Denmark, during the month of May 1962.  As the Berlin situation subsided, all activated ANG units were ordered to be returned to the United States and released from active duty.  The 7131st TFW was inactivated in place in France on 19 July 1962, and left its aircraft and equipment to USAFE.

After returning to St. Louis, the unit was re-equipped with F-100C Super Sabres in late 1962.  It trained with the F-100s for the next 17 years, and upgraded to the improved F-100D in 1971.  Although not activated during the Vietnam War, many of the squadron's pilots were sent to F-100 squadrons in South Vietnam between 1968 and 1971. In 1977, Charles Lindbergh's widow gave permission to designate 110th Tactical Fighter Squadron as "Lindbergh's Own."

In 1978, the unit acquired the "home grown" McDonnell Douglas F-4C Phantom II, the aircraft primarily associated with the Vietnam War.  It again upgraded to the more advanced F-4E Phantom II in 1985, and in 1991 was again upgraded to the F-15A/B Eagle air superiority aircraft with the retirement of the F-4s.  The 131st was one of the last Air National Guard units to convert to the F-15.

Air Combat Command
More than 500 members from the 131st Fighter Wing and the tenant units located at Lambert International Airport were called into service to battle the Great Flood of 1993.  In the post-Cold War era, the unit deployed to Incirlik AB, Turkey in support of Operation Northern Watch in 1996, 1997 and 1998.

Members of the 131st returned in October 2000 from duty rotations in Southwest Asia and Europe, while other unit members were still stationed overseas. Eventually, a total of about 430 wing members were scheduled to deploy, with the majority leaving in October 2000 for Prince Sultan AB, Saudi Arabia, in support of Operation Southern Watch.  A little more than half of the deployed 131st Fighter Wing members and 12 F-15s made up the AEF-9's 110th Expeditionary Fighter Squadron (EFS).  The 110th EFS primarily provides air superiority for Operation Southern Watch.  AEF-9 was deployed from September through November 2000.  In 2004, the improved F-15C Eagle arrived, replacing the older aircraft.

On 16 March 2006, the Air Force announced that elements of the 131st Fighter Wing would become an associate unit assigned to the active duty 509th Bomb Wing.  Consequently, the 131st Fighter Wing transitioned from flying and maintaining the F-15C Eagle fighter to the B-2 Spirit bomber.  The final flight of the F-15C Eagle by the 131st occurred in June 2009 from Lambert International Airport in St. Louis.  The unit was redesignated as the 131st Bomb Wing on 1 October 2008.  The 509th and the 131st joined forces according to what is known as a "classic associate wing" structure.  In a classic association, the active duty 509th retains ownership of the operational assets, including aircraft, maintenance facilities, and so on.  However, each wing maintains its own chain-of-command and organizational structure, while the members of each unit perform their duties in a fully integrated manner.  As a result, active duty and Air National Guard pilots and maintainers fly B-2 missions and sustain the aircraft as though they were one unit.

On the morning of Wednesday, 30 May 2007, a Missouri Air National Guard F-15 pilot ejected safely from his aircraft just before it crashed during a training mission in rural Knox county, Indiana.  The plane went down just before 11 am EDT south of Vincennes, near the Illinois border, as it conducted standard training maneuvers, according to a release from the National Guard.  Investigators said the plane was flying at about 20,000 feet prior to the crash.  The pilot had been with the 131st Fighter Wing for 12 years and was highly experienced, officials said.  The unit had most recently enforced no-fly zones in Iraq.  This crash decreased the 131st's aircraft strength from 20 to 19.

On 2 November 2007, another F-15C from the 131st crashed in Mark Twain National Forest near Boss, Missouri. No property was damaged and no people on the ground were hurt, however the pilot broke an arm and a shoulder, despite ejecting from the plane.  The pilot also was said to be in "shock" by the landowners who found him.  After investigation, the crash was attributed to a flaw in a part of the plane's fuselage; this led to all F-15 aircraft being grounded between November and January 2008.  After the accidents, the 131st's flights were reduced, which was also due to the wing's transition to flying B-2s.

In its 2005 BRAC recommendations, the Department of Defense recommended realignment of the 131st Fighter Wing.  The 110th's F-15s (15 aircraft) were to be distributed to the 57th Wing, Nellis Air Force Base, Nevada (nine aircraft), and 177th Fighter Wing, Atlantic City International Airport AGS, New Jersey (six aircraft). The BRAC distribution recommendation to New Jersey was later rescinded and the 177th Fighter Wing remained equipped with F-16 aircraft.  Following F-15 divestment, the 131st moved to Whiteman Air Force Base, Missouri and became the first Air National Guard B-2 Spirit bomb wing.

The F-15s began to leave Lambert on 15 August 2008, and by January 2009 most of the 13 remaining aircraft were in the main hangar being stripped of markings.  The final two F-15Cs departed on 13 June 2009 after a closing ceremony titled "The End of an Era," which was attended by over 2,000 people. Some pilots had already begun B-2 training, while others chose to move to different units or retire early.  The 131st Fighter Wing was the most experienced F-15 Fighter Wing in the United States; out of the four pilots that flew over 4,000 F-15 flight hours, three of them were from the unit.

Global Strike Command

The 131st Bomb Wing's transition to Air Force Global Strike Command occurred on 4 October 2008 when the 131st Bomb Wing held a ribbon-cutting ceremony at Whiteman AFB.  The ceremony celebrated the first official drill for traditional guardsmen at Whiteman and the grand opening of building 3006, the 131st Bomb Wing's first headquarters there.  On 16 June 2009, the last F-15 departed Lambert Field.

In August 2013, the 131st Bomb Wing was deemed fully mission-capable, meaning that it fully completed the transition to Whiteman Air Force Base.

Lineage
 Established as the  131st Composite Wing and allotted to the Air National Guard on 31 October 1950
 Organized and received federal recognition on 1 November 1950
 Redesignated 131st Fighter Wing on 1 February 1951
 Federalized and placed on active duty on 1 March 1951
 Redesignated 131st Fighter-Bomber Wing on 9 April 1951
 Released from active duty and returned to Missouri state control on 1 December 1952
 Redesignated 131st Bombardment Wing, Light on 1 December 1952
 Redesignated 131st Bombardment Wing, Tactical in 1955
 Redesignated 131st Tactical Fighter Wing (Special Delivery) on 1 January 1960
 Redesignated 131st Tactical Fighter Wing on 1 January 1960
 Federalized and placed on active duty on 1 October 1961
 Released from active duty and returned to Missouri state control on 31 August 1962
 Redesignated 131st Fighter Wing on 15 March 1992
 Redesignated 131st Bomb Wing on 4 October 2008

Assignments
 Missouri Air National Guard, 1 November 1950
 Tenth Air Force, 1 March 1951
 Eighth Air Force, 9 April 1951
 Fifteenth Air Force, 7 August 1951
 Tactical Air Command, 16 November 1951 – 1 December 1952
 Missouri Air National Guard, 1 December 1952
 United States Air Forces in Europe, 1 October 1961
 Missouri Air National Guard, 31 August 1962 – present

Components

Air National Guard
 131st Composite Group (later 131st Fighter Group, Fighter-Bomber Group, Bombardment Group, Tactical Fighter Group, Operations Group), 1 November 1950 – 1 December 1952, 1 December 1952 – 1 November 1958, 1 October 1962 – 30 September 1974, 15 March 1992 – Present
 133d Air Transport Group, 1 November 1950 – 1 March 1951 (Minnesota ANG)
 110th Tactical Fighter Squadron (later, 110th Fighter Squadron, 110th Bomb Squadron), 1 November 1958 – 1 October 1962, 30 September 1974 – 1 January 1993
 117th Fighter-Interceptor Squadron (later 117th Tactical Reconnaissance Squadron), 1 November 1958 – 15 October 1962 (Kansas ANG)
 127th Tactical Fighter Squadron, 1 November 1958 – 1 October 1962 (Kansas ANG)
 180th Tactical Reconnaissance Squadron, 1 November 1958 – 14 April 1962 (GSU St. Joseph, MO)

Stations
 Lambert Field, Missouri, 1 November 1950
 Bergstrom Air Force Base, Texas, 1 March 1951
 George Air Force Base, California, July 1951 – 1 December 1952
 Lambert Field, Missouri, 1 December 1952
 Operated from Toul-Rosieres AB, France, 1 October 1961
 Lambert Field (Later Lambert-St. Louis International Airport), Missouri, August 1962
 Designated Robertson Air National Guard Base, Missouri, 1991–2008
 Whiteman Air Force Base, Missouri, 4 October 2008 – present

Aircraft

 F-51D Mustang, 1950–1952
 B-26 Invader, 1950–1957
 F-80 Shooting Star, 1957
 F-84 Thunderjet, 1957–1958
 F-84F Thunderstreak, 1957–1962

 F-100C/F Super Sabre, 1962–1971
 F-100D/F Super Sabre, 1971–1979
 F-4C Phantom II, 1979–1985
 F-4E Phantom II, 1985–1991
 F-15A/B Eagle, 1991–2004
 F-15C/D Eagle, 2004–2009
 B-2 Spirit, 2009–present

Decorations
 
 Air Force Outstanding Unit Award 31 October 2011 to 31 October 2013

References

Notes

Bibliography

 usaaf.com 364th Fighter Group
 littlefriends.co.uk 364th Fighter Group
 USAF Aircraft Serial Number Search
 
 
 O.W."Ollie" Joiner, Editor, The History of the 364th Fighter Group (1991). ISBN B000OTQ4V6 History of the 364th Fighter Group: O. W. Ollie Joiner: Amazon.com: Books

External links
 http://www.131bw.ang.af.mil/ (Official Website)
 http://www.facebook.com/131BW (131st Bomb Wing Official Facebook page)
 https://www.youtube.com/131stfwfan  (The 131st Fighter Wing YouTube page)
 http://www.131stfwfan.blogspot.com (A Blog about the news of the 131st Fighter Wing)
 History of the 131st Fighter Wing, Missouri Air National Guard, Lambert Field,St. Louis, Mo.
 The Illustrated History of the 131st Fighter Wing, Missouri Air National Guard
 131st Fighter Wing (131st FW)
 https://web.archive.org/web/20160303170957/http://www.foxnews.com/wires/2007Nov02/0,4670,GuardJetCrash,00.html

Wings of the United States Air National Guard
Military units and formations in Missouri
131
Military units and formations established in 1950
1950 establishments in Missouri